Blythia reticulata, commonly known as Blyth's reticulate snake, Blyth's reticulated snake, or the iridescent snake, is a species of snake in the subfamily Natricinae of the family Colubridae of the superfamily Colubroidea. The species is endemic to Asia.

Etymology
The genus Blythia was named after Edward Blyth (1810–1873), curator of the museum of the Asiatic Society of Bengal, by William Theobald in 1868.

Geographic range
B. reticulata is found in India and parts of Southeast Asia. In India it is found in the states of  Arunachal Pradesh, Assam, Manipur, and Meghalaya (Khasi Hills). It is also found in Myanmar (formerly called Burma) and southeastern Tibet (China).

Habitat
The preferred natural habitat of B. reticulata is forest.

Description
B. reticulata has the following scalation. The rostral scale is about as broad as deep, and is visible from above. The suture between the internasals is one-half to two-thirds as long as that between the prefrontals. The frontal is longer than its distance from the end of the snout, about two-thirds the length of the parietals. One postocular and one elongated temporal scale are present. There are six upper labials, of which the third and fourth enter the eye. The first upper labial is smallest, and the sixth largest. Four lower labials are in contact with the anterior chin shields. The posterior chin shields are small. The dorsal scales are in 13 rows at midbody. The ventral scales are 127–130 in number, and the anal scale is divided. The subcaudals count is 19–29.

This snake is blackish-brown above and below, with the lateral and  ventral scales edged with lighter color.

Total length of Blyth's reticulated snake is 16.6 in (420 mm), which includes a tail 1.65 in (42 mm) long.

Behavior
B. reticulata is terrestrial.

Reproduction
The mode of reproduction of B. reticulata is unknown.

Taxonomy
The genus Blythia was monotypic for almost 150 years, until a second species, Blythia hmuifang, was described in 2017.

References

Further reading
Annandale N (1912). "Zoological results of the Abor Expedition, 1911-1912". Records of the Indian Museum, Calcutta 8 (1): 7-59. [Reptilia, pages 37–59] (supplement in same journal, 8 (4): 357–358, 1914). (Aproaspidops antecursorum, new species, p. 46 + Plate V, figures 2, 2a, 2b, 2c).
Blyth E (1854). "Notices and descriptions of various reptiles, new or little known [part 2]". Journal of the Asiatic Society of Bengal, Calcutta 23 (3): 287–302. (Calamaria reticulata, new species, pp. 287–288).
Das I (2002). A Photographic Guide to Snakes and other Reptiles of India. Sanibel Island, Florida: Ralph Curtis Books. 144 pp. . (Blythia reticulata, p. 21).
Smith MA (1943). The Fauna of British India, Ceylon and Burma, Including the Whole of the Indo-Chinese Sub-region. Reptilia and Amphibia. Vol. III.—Serpentes. London: Secretary of State for India. (Taylor and Francis, printers). xii + 583 pp. (Genus Blythia, pp. 338–339; species B. reticulata, pp. 339–340).
Theobald W (1868). "Catalogue of Reptiles in the Museum of the Asiatic Society of Bengal". J. Asiatic Soc. Bengal, Calcutta 37 (extra number 146): (2), vi, 7-88. (Blythia, new genus, p. 44; B. reticulata, new combination, pp. 44–45).

 
Reptiles of China
Reptiles of India
Reptiles of Myanmar
Fauna of Tibet
Reptiles described in 1854
Taxa named by Edward Blyth